Montalvo may refer to:

Places

California
 Montalvo Arts Center (Villa Montalvo), a non-profit center in Saratoga, California, United States
 West Montalvo Oil Field, near Oxnard, California, US

Ventura
 Montalvo, Ventura, California, a former village in Ventura County, California, founded in 1887, now part of the city of Ventura, California
 East Ventura (Metrolink station) (formerly known as "Montalvo"), a Metrolink rail station in the city of Ventura, California, US

Elsewhere
 Montalvo (Constância), a parish in the municipality of Constância, Portugal
 Montalvo, Ecuador‘, the capital of Montalvo Canton, Los Ríos Province, Ecuador

People
 Abelardo Montalvo (1876–1950), President of Ecuador from October 1933-September 1934
 Agustin de Hinojosa y Montalvo, O.F.M. (1575–1631), Spanish Roman Catholic Bishop of Nicaragua (1630–1631)
 Alonso Díaz de Montalvo (1405–1499), Spanish jurist
 Bartolomé Montalvo (1769–1846), a Spanish painter
 Benito Montalvo (born 1985), Argentine footballer 
 Carlos Montalvo, Cuban sprint canoer
 Drew G. Montalvo, American-born DJ and music producer 
 Edilberto Jesús Buenfil Montalvo (born 1938), Mexican politician from the IRP
 Eleonora Ramirez di Montalvo (1602–1659), Italian educator, author, and poet
 Eric Montalvo, American lawyer 
 Felix  Montalvo, athlete in the 2010 Central American and Caribbean Junior Championships
 Francisco José Montalvo y Ambulodi Arriola y Casabant Valdespino (1754–1822), Spanish soldier, colonial administrator and politician
 Gabriel Montalvo Higuera (1930–2006), Roman Catholic archbishop and Vatican nuncio to the United States 
 Garci Rodríguez de Montalvo (c. 1450–1505), a Spanish writer who coined the name "California"
 Genie Montalvo (born 1951), Puerto Rican actress, director, producer and author
 Gregorio de Montalvo Olivera, O.P. (1529–1592), Roman Catholic Bishop of Cuzco (1587–1592) and then Bishop of Yucatán
 Jeff Montalvo (born 1987), an American music producer
 José Montalvo (choreographer)(born 1954), French dancer and choreographer
 José Leandro Montalvo Guenard (1885–1950), Puerto Rican physician, inventor, anthropologist and historian
 José Luis Montalvo (1946–1994), Chicano writer, poet, and community activist
 José Luis Montalvo (1946–1994), a Chicano writer, poet, and community activist
 José Montalvo (choreographer), a French choreographer
 José Ramón Hinojosa Montalvo (born 1947), Spanish historian and Professor of Medieval History at the University of Alicante 
 Juan Bustillos Montalvo (born 1955), Mexican politician affiliated with the Institutional Revolutionary Party
 Juan Jiménez de Montalvo (1551–?), interim viceroy of Peru from 1621 to 1622
 Juan Montalvo (1832–1889), a famous Ecuadorian author and essayist
 Juan Montalvo (bishop), O.P. or Juan de Montalvo (died 1586), Roman Catholic Bishop of Cartagena (1578–1586)
 Jesús Manuel Patrón Montalvo (born 1957), Mexican politician from the Institutional Revolutionary Party
 Laura Montalvo (born 1976), Argentine former professional female tennis player
 Maria de las Mercedes Santa Cruz y Montalvo  (1789–1852), Cuban author
 Miguel Montalvo (born 1943), Cuban basketball player
 Niurka Montalvo (born 1968), Spanish athlete
 Óscar Montalvo Finetti (born 1937), Peruvian former football player
 Paco Montalvo (born 1992), Spanish classical musician and creator of flamenco violin as the main voice
 Pedro Montalvo Gómez (born 1968), Mexican politician from the Institutional Revolutionary Party
 Rafael Montalvo (born 1964), a Major League Baseball pitcher
 Ramón Montalvo Hernández (born 1974), Mexican politician affiliated with the PRD
 Victorio Montalvo Rojas (born 1966), Mexican lawyer and politician affiliated with the PDR
 Yolanda del Carmen Montalvo López (born 1960), Mexican politician from the National Action Party
 Yuvanna Montalvo (born 1988), Venezuelan model and actress